Dearborn County Asylum for the Poor, also known as the Dearborn County Home, is a historic poor house located in Manchester Township, Dearborn County, Indiana.  It was built in 1882, and is a -story, cruciform plan, Late Victorian style brick building. It sits on a dressed limestone foundation and houses 64 rooms.  Also on the property is a contributing smokehouse.  The Asylum closed in 1980.

It was added to the National Register of Historic Places in 2000.

References

Government buildings on the National Register of Historic Places in Indiana
Victorian architecture in Indiana
Government buildings completed in 1882
Buildings and structures in Dearborn County, Indiana
National Register of Historic Places in Dearborn County, Indiana